Hello Pop! is the third of five short films starring Ted Healy and His Stooges released by Metro-Goldwyn-Mayer on September 16, 1933. A musical-comedy film, the film also featured the Albertina Rasch Dancers and Bonnie Bonnell (Healy's girlfriend at the time). The film was considered lost until a 35mm nitrate print was discovered in Australia in January 2013. Stooges Moe Howard, Larry Fine and Curly Howard were billed as "Howard, Fine and Howard."

Plot
A theater producer (Healy) is trying to stage an elaborate musical revue. His efforts are constantly interrupted by demanding back stage personalities: a flaky musician (Henry Armetta), a woman who keeps try to ask him something (Bonnie Bonnell), and his raucous sons (the Stooges in children's costumes).

He is able to get the show ready for presentation, but during the main number, the Three Stooges slip beneath the enormous hoopskirt costume worn by the leading vocalist. They emerge on stage during the performance, ruining the show.

Cast
Ted Healy as Papa
Moe Howard as Son
Larry Fine as Son
Curly Howard as Son
Bonnie Bonnell as Bonnie
Henry Armetta as Italian Musician
Edward Brophy as Brophy
Rosetta Duncan as Singer/Dancer
Vivian Duncan as Singer/Dancer
The Albertina Rasch Girls as Themselves
Tiny Sandford as Strongman

Production
Originally planned under the title Back Stage, Hello Pop! was the third of five short films made by MGM featuring the vaudeville act billed as “Ted Healy and His Stooges.” The act focused primarily on Healy’s wit and caustic commentary, with the Stooges receiving the brunt of the physical slapstick. For the MGM short films, actress Bonnie Bonnell was incorporated into the configuration as Healy’s love interest.

Hello Pop! was the second of two MGM Stooges shorts filmed in the two-color Technicolor process. (Nertsery Rhymes, the act’s first film for MGM, was also shot in color.). The use of color was predicated on the decision to build plot devices in Hello Pop! around the following discarded Technicolor musical numbers from earlier MGM films:
"I'm Sailing on a Sunbeam" from the feature It’s a Great Life (1929);
"Moon Ballet" from the unreleased feature The March of Time (1930)

Preservation status
In the 1930s, studios were offered their two-color negatives by Technicolor, who was at that time storing them. Most studios declined the offer, the camera negatives were junked, and original release prints usually disposed of shortly after a theatrical run. A print existed in MGM's Vault #7, but was destroyed by a fire in 1965.

In January 2013, it was announced that Hello Pop! had been located in an Australian private film collection and was in the process of being restored for public viewing. The film was screened at Film Forum in New York City on September 30, 2013.

Home media
Warner Archive released Hello Pop! on September 24, 2014 on DVD in region 1 as part of the Classic Shorts From The Dream Factory series, Volume 3 DVD set (featuring Howard, Fine and Howard). The film was released with five other Ted Healy and the Stooges shorts made for MGM, Plane Nuts (1933), Roast Beef and Movies (1934), Beer and Pretzels (1933), Nertsery Rhymes (1933), and The Big Idea (1934).

See also
The Three Stooges filmography
Jail Birds of Paradise (1934)

References

External links

Hello Pop! on Dailymotion

1933 films
Films directed by Jack Cummings
Metro-Goldwyn-Mayer short films
The Three Stooges films
1930s rediscovered films
1933 musical comedy films
American musical comedy films
Rediscovered American films
1930s English-language films
1930s American films